Risdon Park High School (also known as R.P.H.S. was a co-ed state school for years 8-12 in Port Pirie, South Australia, Australia.

The school was closed at the end of 1994.

It amalgamated with the Port Pirie High School forming the John Pirie Secondary School, to which students were moved.

Risdon Park High School was located on Senate Rd, between Hannan St, Creasy St, and Ferme St in the suburb of Risdon Park in Port Pirie.  The site is now the Risdon Grove Housing Estate.

Sports Day Houses
On the school's annual internal sports day, students competed under four houses:
 Germein (red)
 Harris (green)
 Thomson (yellow)
 Warren (blue)

Principals
Former principals of the school include:
 Graham Steele
 Moss Potter
 D.J. Darr
 Peter Griffin

References
 Risdon Park High School 1987 Yearbook
 Risdon Park High School 1973 Yearbook
 Risdon Park High School 1975 Yearbook

High schools in South Australia
Public schools in South Australia
Defunct schools in South Australia